Roger Palmer (born 30 January 1959) is a former footballer. He played for Manchester City and Oldham Athletic. He is the all-time leading goal-scorer at Oldham.

Roger was an undemonstrative player, and a quiet and modest man off the field.

Roger's career culminated in a superb run of success for Oldham, including appearances in the 1990 Football League Cup Final at Wembley and FA Cup semi-finals. In his testimonial season (1990–91), Oldham won the Second Division championship and rejoined the top flight of English football.

Since his retirement from football, he has been reclusive but he is remembered with fondness in Oldham.
The Latics fans demonstrate their reverence for Roger in their chant "Ooooh, Roger Palmer, oooooh, Roger Palmer,".

In January 2008, the BBC Sport website put out an appeal for information on Palmer's whereabouts, ahead of the Oldham v Everton FA Cup Third Round tie. The teams last played in a cup tie in 1990, with Palmer the only player whose whereabouts were unknown. Both the media and Oldham Athletic attempted several times to contact Palmer without success. 'Where is Roger Palmer?' went round Boundary Park several times.

Finally, on 8 May 2010 on the final day of the season against Charlton Athletic, Palmer made an appearance on the Boundary Park pitch at half time to rapturous applause and chants of "OOOHH ROGER PALMER!".

Roger has been living on the Racecourse Estate in Sale, Greater Manchester, since retirement. He played the odd game for local community centre and a couple of Sunday games for local pubs.

References

External links 
 

1959 births
Living people
Manchester City F.C. players
Oldham Athletic A.F.C. players
Premier League players
English footballers
People from Sale, Greater Manchester
English Football League players
Association football forwards
Association football midfielders